Robert Spall  (5 March 1890 – 13 August 1918),  was a Canadian recipient of the Victoria Cross, the highest and most prestigious award for gallantry in the face of the enemy that can be awarded to British and Commonwealth forces.

Robert Spall was born in Acton, London, England on March 5, 1890. He enlisted in the Canadian Expeditionary Force in July 1915.

Spall was 28 years old, and a sergeant in Princess Patricia's Canadian Light Infantry, Canadian Expeditionary Force during the First World War, and was awarded the VC for his actions on 13 August 1918 near Parvillers-le-Quesnoy, France.

His citation reads:

Sergeant Spall's final resting place was lost and as such he is commemorated on the Canadian National Vimy Memorial with the over 11,000 other Canadian dead of the war killed in France but whose remains were lost or never recovered.

His Victoria Cross is displayed at the PPCLI Museum at The Military Museums in Calgary, Alberta, Canada.

He is also commemorated in Acton, London, England with a plaque outside the house he was born at 16 Spencer Road.

References

Further reading 
Monuments to Courage, (David Harvey, 1999)
The Register of the Victoria Cross (This England, 1997)

External links
 Robert Spall's digitized service file
 Legion Magazine
 Veterans Affairs Canada
 Canadian Great War Project

1890 births
1918 deaths
Military personnel from London
Canadian World War I recipients of the Victoria Cross
Canadian military personnel killed in World War I
English emigrants to Canada
Canadian Expeditionary Force soldiers
Princess Patricia's Canadian Light Infantry soldiers